Ben Rayner is a music critic and writer for the Toronto Star since 1998.  His commentary on artists is extensively cited across the industry.  Indie88 considers him "of the most respected industry professionals around."

In 2012, he served on the jury for the Polaris Music Prize.

References

Canadian music journalists
Living people
Canadian music critics
Toronto Star people
Year of birth missing (living people)
Place of birth missing (living people)